Ramerupt is a commune in the Aube department in north-central France.

Population

Personalities
 Meir ben Samuel (1060-1135), also known as The RaM, French rabbi and tosafist
 Rashbam, medieval rabbi and scriptural commentator
 Rabbeinu Tam, medieval rabbi

See also
 Communes of the Aube department
 Tosafists

References

Communes of Aube
Aube communes articles needing translation from French Wikipedia